Multipeniata is a genus of flatworms in the order Prolecithophora. It is the only genus in the monotypic family Multipeniatidae.

Species
The following species are recognised in the genus Multipeniata:
 Multipeniata batalansae Nasonov, 1927 
 Multipeniata birmanse (Westblad, 1956) 
 Multipeniata californica Karling & Jondelius, 1995 
 Multipeniata kho Nasonov, 1927

References

Platyhelminthes